The 1949 Oregon State Beavers football team represented Oregon State College as a member of the Pacific Coast Conference (PCC) during the 1949 college football season.  In their first season under head coach Kip Taylor, the Beavers compiled an overall record of 7–3 with a mark of 5–3 in conference play, placed fifth in the PCC, and outscored their opponents 232 to 188.  The team played one home game on campus at Bell Field in Corvallis and three at Multnomah Stadium in Portland.

Taylor, a Michigan State assistant, was hired in late March, following the resignation of longtime head coach Lon Stiner a month earlier. Taylor was a native of Ann Arbor, Michigan, and played for the Michigan Wolverines in the late 1920s. At the time of his hiring, he told the press: "I'm a Michigan man and I like the Michigan system. We'll have the single wingback, in all probability, with my own variations."

Schedule

Roster
 HB Ken Carpenter, Sr.

References

Oregon State
Oregon State Beavers football seasons
Oregon State Beavers football